Gustav Adolph Ackermann (16 January 1791 – 19 February 1872) was a German lawyer and author of a notable book on European knightly orders.

Ackermann was born in Auerbach in Vogtland, Saxony. He was Königlich Sachsischer Appelationsrat [Royal Saxon appeal councillor] at the courthouse in Dresden, Saxony and a great connoisseur of the 19th-century and medieval German and European knightly orders.

In 1855 his Ordensbuch [Orders book] appeared in Annaberg with the subtitle Sämtlicher in Europa blühender und erloschener Orden und Ehrenzeichen [Complete gathering of flourishing and extinct orders and honorific decorations in Europe]. Despite its title, the book is not a complete description of orders and decorations, but it is a valuable resource for researchers.

As a lawyer he also published in his field. In 1849 his Rechtssätze aus Erkenntnissen des Königl. Oberappelationsgerichts zu Dresden [Law sets about findings of royal high appeal court in Dresden], a work on the then applicable jurisprudence, appeared in Saxony.  He died in Dresden on February 19, 1872.

Works 
 

1791 births
1872 deaths
People from Auerbach (Vogtland)
Jurists from Saxony
19th-century German lawyers
19th-century German jurists